The 2009 Big East women's basketball tournament took place in March 2009 at the XL Center in Hartford, Connecticut.  The Connecticut Huskies defeated the Louisville Cardinals 75-36 in the tournament finals to receive the Big East Conference's automatic bid to the 2009 NCAA tournament. This was the first Big East tournament to include all 16 of the conference's teams. The teams finishing 9 through 16 in the regular season standings played first-round games, while teams 5 through 8 received byes to the second round. The top 4 teams during the regular season received double-byes to the quarterfinals.

Bracket

Championship Game 

Big East women's basketball tournament
2008–09 Big East Conference women's basketball season